Gustave Bémont (April 1, 1857 – October 28, 1932, in Paris) was a French chemist, best remembered for his work in radioactivity and the discovery of elements radium and polonium with Pierre and Marie Curie. He was head of chemistry at ESPCI Paris.

Publications

References 

1857 births
1932 deaths
French chemists